Henri Hitier (16 June 1864 – 1 April 1958) was a French agronomist.

Family

Henri-Joseph-Robert Hitier was born in Revelles, Somme, on 16 June 1864.
His parents were Joseph Hitier, Consul-General of France in China, and Augustine Vauchelet (1832–1914).
His brother was Joseph Hitier (born in 1865). 
Joseph became an assistant professor of law at the University of Grenoble and later Professor of Rural Economics at the National Agronomic Institute. 
Both were also involved in running the family-owned form in Revelles and a pasturage in Bray-lès-Mareuil.
Henri married Thérèse Delepouve.
They had several children including Jeanne Hitier (1895–1985), who married Adalbert de Chassepot de Pissy (1876–1952).

Career

Between 1885 and 1893 Henri Hitier studied first at the Institut national agronomique and then at the École nationale des Mines.
From 1893 to 1935 he taught courses at the Institut national agronomique on rural economics, comparative agriculture and agricultural geography.
Hitier was a lecturer at the Institut national agronomique from 1900 to 1935, and from 1911 he was Professor of Comparative Agriculture at the institute.

Henri Hitier and  Henri Hauser co-directed a major inquiry into French manufacturing in 1915–16 for the National Association of Economic Expansion.
The inquiry was supervised by Paul de Rousiers.
From 1930 Hitiere was Professor of Rural Economy at the École des sciences politiques.
Hitier became a permanent Secretary of the Académie d'agriculture.
Henri Hitier' died in the 1st arrondissement of Paris on 1 April 1958.

Work

Hitier mainly worked in the field of agronomy. 
He undertook systematic surveys of France's natural agricultural regions, and then those of other geographic regions in Central and Western Europe and North Africa. 
He showed that there were links between the geological formations and the agricultural systems.
He worked on developing farming practices that would give the most efficient yield, including rational crop management based on soil and climate, and the careful choice of methods of agriculture and use of fertilizer.

Publications

Publications by Henri Hitier include:

Notes

Sources

1864 births
1958 deaths
French agronomists